Khvor Khvor-e Olya (also Romanized as Khvor Khvor-e ‘Olyā and Khūr Khūr-e ‘Olyā) is a village in Qeshlaq-e Sharqi Rural District, Qeshlaq Dasht District, Bileh Savar County, Ardabil Province, Iran. At the 2006 census, its population was 191, in 48 families.

References 

Towns and villages in Bileh Savar County